Judas T. Prada is a basketball coach. From 1994 to 1995, he served as the interim head basketball coach at South Alabama, where he compiled an  8-15 (.348) record. Prada was also an assistant coach at UC Santa Barbara for two years. He currently coaches the Fujian Sturgeons in the Chinese Basketball Association.

References

External links
South Alabama Athletics

Living people
American men's basketball coaches
Basketball coaches from Alabama
Denver Nuggets assistant coaches
Loyola Marymount Lions men's basketball coaches
San Antonio Spurs assistant coaches
South Alabama Jaguars men's basketball coaches
UC Santa Barbara Gauchos men's basketball coaches
Year of birth missing (living people)